is a passenger railway station in located in the city of Matsubara,  Osaka Prefecture, Japan, operated by the private railway operator Kintetsu Railway.

Lines
Takawashi Station is served by the Minami Osaka Line, and is located 10.0 rail kilometers from the starting point of the line at Ōsaka Abenobashi Station.

Station layout
The station consists of two ground-level island platforms connected by an elevated station building. Inside the wickets, there is a small kiosk selling pastries and sandwiches, as well as vending machines for drinks. The publicly-accessible portion outside the gates also contains a Family Mart convenience store and a Mr. Donut shop. The station building is linked to the south with elevated pedestrian decks over Prefectural Route 12 leading to the Youmenity Matsubara shopping complex and adjacent bus terminal.

Platforms

Adjacent stations

History
Kawachi-Matsubara Station opened on April 18, 1922.

Passenger statistics
In fiscal 2018, the station was used by an average of 29,976 passengers daily.

Surrounding area
Shibagaki Shrine 
Osaka Prefectural Ikuno High School
Matsubara City Matsubara Junior High School
Matsubara Elementary School 
Matsubara City Hall

See also
List of railway stations in Japan

References

External links

 Kintetsu: Kawachi-Matsubara Station 

Railway stations in Japan opened in 1922
Railway stations in Osaka Prefecture
Matsubara, Osaka